USS Chicopee (AO-34) was the lead ship of her class of oilers for the United States Navy during World War II. She was the second U.S. Navy ship named for the Chicopee River located in Massachusetts.

History
Chicopee was laid down as Esso Trenton on 14 May 1941 under a Maritime Commission contract at Sun Shipbuilding and Drydock Co. of Chester, Pennsylvania; launched 6 September 1941; sponsored by Mrs. N. L. Lank; acquired by the Navy 3 January 1942, and commissioned on 9 February.

After a short period as station tanker at Casco Bay, Maine, Chicopee made several oil runs between ports on the Gulf of Mexico and the U.S. East Coast. She departed Norfolk 8 June 1942 for NS Argentia, Newfoundland, and served as station tanker there from 12 June until 8 July when she sailed to Reykjavík, Iceland, returning to Norfolk 25 July.

From August to November 1942 Chicopee resumed coastwise fueling operations. She then made three voyages to a midocean point with the  task group to launch U.S. Army planes to North Africa, and in March resumed her oil runs between Norfolk and the Gulf ports with one voyage to Argentia.

Chicopee sailed from Norfolk 10 May 1943 as an escort oiler and arrived at Oran 23 May to serve as station tanker until 28 July when she got underway for New York. After a convoy voyage to Gibraltar, she was overhauled and on 8 October departed on escort oiler duty to Derry, Northern Ireland, and HMNB Clyde, Scotland returning to Norfolk 3 December for overhaul. From 3 February until 26 September 1944, Chicopee operated as an escort oiler between Norfolk and the North African ports of Casablanca, Oran, and Bizerte.

She departed Norfolk 28 October 1944 for Pacific service and arrived at Ulithi 8 December. She sailed out of Ulithi supplying fuel for the U.S. Pacific Fleet Fast Carrier Task Force engaged in the Luzon, Iwo Jima, and Okinawa operations, and air strikes against Japan until the close of the war.

After serving as station tanker in Tokyo Bay from 26 September until 28 October 1945, Chicopee cleared for San Francisco, arriving 9 November. On 14 February 1946 she was decommissioned at Mare Island and sold through the Maritime Commission for return to her owners, Standard Oil of New Jersey, 1 July 1946.

In 1963, the ex-Chicopee was purchased by Sea-Land in 1963 for conversion to a container ship. In 1978, the extant portions of the hull of ex-Chicopee were scrapped, when the 1963 mid-body section was paired with new fore and aft sections, as the 17,618-GRT Sea-Land Adventurer. As of 2002, this ship is still operating as Maersk Koper.

Awards and honors
Chicopee earned four battle stars for World War II service.

References

External links
 
HyperWar's USS Chicopee (AO-34) page

 

Chicopee-class oilers
Ships built by the Sun Shipbuilding & Drydock Company
World War II auxiliary ships of the United States
World War II tankers of the United States
1941 ships